Club Deportivo Abarán was a Spanish football club based in Abarán, in the Region of Murcia. Created in 1948, the club first reached the Segunda División in 1963, playing two seasons but being dissolved only four years later.

Season to season

2 seasons in Segunda División
4 seasons in Tercera División

References

External links
BDFutbol team profile
ArefePedia team profile 

Football clubs in the Region of Murcia
Association football clubs established in 1948
Association football clubs disestablished in 1967
1948 establishments in Spain
1967 disestablishments in Spain
Segunda División clubs